Østergaard  is a Danish surname, literally meaning east farm. The double a "aa" is equivalent of å in common nouns and is retained from the pre-1948 orthography in proper nouns only.

Østergaard may refer to:
 Flemming Østergaard (born 1943), Danish businessman
 Morten Østergaard (born 1976), Danish politician
 Niki Østergaard (born 1988), Danish road racing cyclist
 Søren Østergaard (born 1957), Danish film, television and stage actor
 Ulrich Østergaard (born 1981), Danish speedway rider

The Anglicisation Ostergaard may refer to:
 Geoffrey Ostergaard (1926–1990), political scientist and anarcho-pacifist
 Henrik Ostergaard (1968–2011), Danish-born guitarist/vocalist and founder of rock band Dirty Looks

Danish-language surnames